Tihomir "Bata" Ognjanov (Serbian Cyrillic: Тихомир Огњанов; 2 March 1927 – 2 July 2006) was a Serbian footballer who was part of Yugoslavia national football team at the 1950 and 1954 FIFA World Cup. He won the silver medal at the 1952 Summer Olympics.

He later became a manager. He played for Spartak Subotica (in three different periods), Partizan (when he was in the Yugoslav Army although he only played in friendly matches) and Red Star. With Red Star  he won 2 national championships (1951, 1953) and 2 Yugoslav cups (1949, 1950).

References

External links
 Profile at Serbian federation site

1927 births
2006 deaths
Serbian footballers
Yugoslav footballers
Yugoslavia international footballers
Association football defenders
ŽAK Subotica players
FK Spartak Subotica players
FK Partizan players
Red Star Belgrade footballers
Yugoslav First League players
1950 FIFA World Cup players
1954 FIFA World Cup players
Olympic footballers of Yugoslavia
Olympic silver medalists for Yugoslavia
Footballers at the 1952 Summer Olympics
Serbian football managers
Sportspeople from Subotica
Olympic medalists in football
Medalists at the 1952 Summer Olympics
FK Bačka 1901 managers